Eucalyptus brandiana is a mallet that is endemic to a small area in the Fitzgerald River National Park in Western Australia. It has smooth, shiny silvery bark, oblong to lance-shaped, glossy green adult leaves, single red flower buds in leaf axils, pink flowers and prominently winged fruit.

Description
It has smooth, shiny silver grey bark that is shed in strips. The flower buds are arranged singly in leaf axils on a down-curved peduncle. Peak flowering occurs in late winter to spring and the flowers are pink.

Taxonomy
Eucalyptus brandiana was first formally described by Stephen Hopper and Nathan K. McQuoid and the description was published in Australian Systematic Botany from a specimen at the Fitzgerald River Inlet. The specific epithet (brandiana) honours Grady Brand, the curator of the Western Australian Botanic Garden, Kings Park and Botanic Garden.

This species often hybridises with E. arborella.

Distribution
This mallet grows on spongolite hills and escarpments near the Fitzgerald River Inlet. Other species common in the same area include E. arborella, E. falcata, Banksia lemanniana and B. laevigata.

Conservation
Eucalyptus brandiana is classified as "Priority Two" by the Western Australian Government Department of Parks and Wildlife meaning that it is poorly known and from only one or a few locations.

See also
List of Eucalyptus species

References

brandiana
Endemic flora of Western Australia
Myrtales of Australia
Eucalypts of Western Australia
Plants described in 2009
Taxa named by Stephen Hopper